Ana María Gazmuri Vieira (Santiago, January 22, 1966) is a Chilean actress, politician and activist.

Daughter of the agronomist Renato Gazmuri Schleyer and the sociologist and writer Ana María Vieira, she is the eldest of six siblings. Sister of also actress Victoria Gazmuri and niece of politician María Olivia Gazmuri Schleyer. She studied from first to third grade in Necochea (Argentina), and then returned to Chile to continue her primary studies at La Maisonette schools, Lo Castillo and the Liceo 14. First she began to study journalism at the Pontifical Catholic University of Chile, but the following year she began to study theater with Fernando González. She was married to television director Cristián Mason. She is currently married to Nicolás Dormal.

Her debut on television was with the telenovela Bellas y audaces (1988) with the leading role of Fernanda, where she shared credits with Sonia Viveros, Osvaldo Silva and Luz Jiménez. She continued to work in telenovelas such as Jaque Mate, Amor a Domicilio, to consecrate herself in Ámame (1993) as Francisca García-Méndez. Her last participation so far was in Mujeres de lujo (2010).

He came to the big screen with the film Todo por nada (1989), by Alfredo Lamadrid, El País de Octubre and Viva el Novio.

Later, from 2003 to 2012, she was part of the stable cast of comedian actors from Chilevisión at Teatro en Chilevisión.

She is currently the executive director of Fundación Daya, founded by her and her husband Nicolás Dormal, which promotes the use of alternative therapies, mainly Medical cannabis.

She was registered as a candidate for deputy in the 2021 parliamentary elections as an independent under Comunes party quota in district 12, on the list of the conglomerate Apruebo Dignidad. In the November 21 elections, she was elected with 7.2% of the votes.

Filmography

Films

Telesnovelas

TV Series

References 

1974 births
Chilean television actresses
Chilean film actresses
Living people
People from Santiago
Actresses from Santiago
20th-century Chilean actresses
21st-century Chilean actresses
Pontifical Catholic University of Chile alumni
Chilean actor-politicians
Members of the Chamber of Deputies of Chile